Kennedy is an unincorporated community in Clay Township, Spencer County, in the U.S. state of Indiana.

History
Kennedy once contained a post office called Madrid. The Madrid post office was established in 1888, and remained in operation until it was discontinued in 1915. David F. Kennedy served as an early postmaster.

Geography

References

Unincorporated communities in Spencer County, Indiana
Unincorporated communities in Indiana